The Proceedings of the American Catholic Philosophical Association is an annual series containing papers presented at the meetings of the American Catholic Philosophical Association. Each year the association sponsors a conference organized around a particular philosophical topic and all papers presented at the main sessions (as opposed to satellite sessions) are published the following year in the Proceedings. Each volume is an edited anthology and the secretary of the association serves as editor-in-chief. All papers presented at the conference are subject to peer review, although the acceptance rate varies depending on the number of papers submitted. The series is published on behalf of the association by the Philosophy Documentation Center.

Abstracting and indexing 
The Proceedings are abstracted and indexed in:

See also 
 List of philosophy journals

External links 
 

English-language journals
Philosophy journals
Publications established in 1927
Annual journals
Christian philosophy
Philosophy Documentation Center academic journals
Religious philosophical literature